Lara Arruabarrena Vecino (born 20 March 1992) is a former professional tennis player from Spain. On 3 July 2017, she reached a career-high WTA singles ranking of 52, and her best doubles ranking is world No. 28, set on 22 February 2016. Arruabarrena retired from professional tour in August 2022.

Personal life and background
Arruabarrena is coached by Andoni Vivanco. Her father, Juan, is a lithographer, and her mother, Blanca, is a nurse. She also has one younger sister. Arruabarrena started playing tennis at age eight when she took lessons with a friend for fun. She stated that her favourite surface is clay. When she was 15, she moved to Barcelona to train with Spanish Federation. Her tennis idol growing up was Justine Henin.

Career highlights

2007: ITF Circuit debut
Arruabarrena made her debut appearance at the ITF Circuit at Les Francqueses del Valles, France, where she lost in first round against her compatriot Lucia Cervera-Vazquez, in straight-sets.

2008: First ITF title
In July, she won her first ITF title on a $10k event in Oviedo. In the final, she defeated Hermon Brhane, in straight sets.

2012: First WTA Tour title, Grand Slam main-draw debut
Arruabarrena won her first WTA tournament at the Copa Colsanitas in Bogotá, beating Alexandra Panova in the final. She then qualified for the main draw of the 2012 French Open, but lost in the first round to former champion Ana Ivanovic, in straight sets.

Performance timelines

Only main-draw results in WTA Tour, Grand Slam tournaments, Fed Cup/Billie Jean King Cup and Olympic Games are included in win–loss records.

Singles

Doubles

WTA career finals

Singles: 4 (2 titles, 2 runner-ups)

Doubles: 14 (8 titles, 6 runner-ups)

WTA Challenger finals

Singles: 1 (title)

Doubles: 1 (title)

ITF Circuit finals

Singles: 14 (12 titles, 2 runner–ups)

Doubles: 15 (9 titles, 6 runner–ups)

Junior Grand Slam tournament finals

Doubles: 1 (runner–up)

Wins over top 10 players

Notes

References

External links

 
 
 
 
 

1992 births
Living people
Spanish female tennis players
Hopman Cup competitors
People from Tolosa, Spain
Tennis players from the Basque Country (autonomous community)
Sportspeople from Gipuzkoa
Female tennis players playing padel